Ron Highland (born March 1, 1947) is a member of the Kansas House of Representatives. He was elected in 2012 as a Republican and lives in Wamego.  The American Conservative Union had given him a lifetime evaluation of 80%.

References

External links
http://ronhighland.com/
http://votesmart.org/candidate/biography/140793/ron-highland#.VCXtmxZvDWA
http://ballotpedia.org/Ron_Highland

Republican Party members of the Kansas House of Representatives
Living people
People from Wamego, Kansas
21st-century American politicians
1947 births
Kansas State University alumni